The Silver Jubilee Railway Bridge Bharuch is a railway bridge over the Narmada River in India, located between the Ankleshwar Junction and Bharuch Junction railway stations.

History

The bridge was constructed for the Bombay, Baroda and Central India Railway. It was built by Braithwaite & Co. in association with the Hindustan Construction Company, who built the piers. The bridge was named in honour of the silver jubilee of King-Emperor George V.

Construction work began in 1933. The bridge was completed in 1935 and inaugurated on 20 December 1935 by Michael Knatchbull, 5th Baron Brabourne, the Governor of Bombay. The girders of the bridge were built of mild steel. The bridge was damaged in July 1970 by an earthquake.

The bridge carries a double-track electrified railway line. The adjacent Golden Bridge, which was completed in 1881, carries road traffic.

See also
 List of longest bridges above water in India

External links
 
 

1935 establishments in India
Bridges completed in 1935
Bridges over the Narmada River
Bridges in Gujarat
Bharuch district
Silver Jubilee of George V
Transport in Ankleshwar
Transport in Bharuch
20th-century architecture in India